Texas State Highway Spur 601 or Spur 601 is a  freeway spur route in El Paso County in the U.S. State of Texas. It runs from U.S. Route 54 (US 54) in El Paso eastward to Loop 375 in the Fort Bliss Military Reservation. The construction of this freeway improved access to Biggs Army Airfield and Fort Bliss. The route is officially known as the Liberty Expressway.

Route description
Spur 601 begins at an intersection with U.S. Route 54 about 4 miles north of Interstate 10.  The route travels eastward along the former location of Fred Wilson Avenue, just north of Fort Bliss National Cemetery.  The route then jogs southeast then northeast, squeezing between the runways of Biggs Army Airfield and El Paso International Airport.  The route then turns back to the east and reaches its eastern terminus at Texas State Highway Loop 375.

History
Spur 601 was officially designated on August 24, 2006 on its current route. In February 2007, the Texas Department of Transportation (TxDOT) entered into a "pass-through finance" agreement to obtain funds for the construction of the route; groundbreaking was held in the same year. On May 29, 2009, the first segment of Spur 601 opened to traffic between Global Reach Drive and Loop 375. In 2010, then Fort Bliss commander Major General Howard Bromberg asked that the route be named the Liberty Expressway; the request was approved on March 16 by the city of El Paso. Construction of Spur 601 was completed in January 2011, and a ceremony commemorating the freeway's completion was held by TxDOT on April 27, 2011. The construction of the route cost $368 million.

Junction list

See also

References

External links

601
Transportation in El Paso County, Texas